Lucca Mesinas (born 20 April 1996) is a Peruvian surfer.

In 2020, Mesinas won the inaugural edition of the Gordo Barreda Cup, a tribute to Peruvian surfing legend Sergio Barreda.

He placed 7th overall at the 2021 ISA World Surfing Games, where he qualified for the 2020 Summer Olympics. He competed in the men's shortboard event, winning his Round 1 heat over top American surfer Kolohe Andino.

He was raised in the beach town of Máncora.

References

External links
 

Peruvian surfers
Living people
1996 births
Surfers at the 2020 Summer Olympics
Olympic surfers of Peru
World Surf League surfers
Pan American Games gold medalists for Peru
Pan American Games medalists in surfing
Surfers at the 2019 Pan American Games
Medalists at the 2019 Pan American Games
Sportspeople from Lima
People from Piura Region
21st-century Peruvian people